Penelope "Penny" Rowson (born 3 May 1992) is a British former professional racing cyclist.

Career
After finishing 3rd in the 2009 Cheshire Classic Road Race, Rowson joined, in 2010, the Matrix Fitness professional team. 

In 2012, she became the first female winner of the Newport Nocturne cycling race. She left Matrix in 2013 and joined the cycling pro team run by the Breast Cancer Care charity.

In 2014, she returned to the Matrix team but in August 2015 she announced her retirement from the sport.

See also
 List of 2015 UCI Women's Teams and riders
 Breast cancer

References

1992 births
Living people
British female cyclists
Place of birth missing (living people)
21st-century British women